Kamarcut is a traditional South Indian candy made out of jaggery and is made by slowly cooking jaggery with water until it achieves a honeylike consistency. Shredded coconut can be added to the mixture to create texture.

It used to be available widely in South India but has become harder to obtain in urban areas. It is still often sold in villages, but is still hard to obtain.

References 

Confectionery
Indian desserts